William Henry Emmerson (born 1801, Cambridge; died 31 July 1868, Cambridge) was an English cricketer who was associated with Cambridge Union Club and made his first-class debut in 1829.

References

Bibliography
 

1801 births
1868 deaths
English cricketers
English cricketers of 1826 to 1863
Cambridge Town Club cricketers